Wittia is a genus of moths in the family Erebidae.

Most species were previously placed in the genus Eilema.

Species
 Wittia klapperichi (Daniel, 1954)
 Wittia sororcula (Hufnagel, 1766)
 Wittia yazakii Dubatolov, Kishida & M. Wang, 2012

References

 

Lithosiina
Heteroneura genera